Bob Steele (22 April 1901 – 9 November 1985) was an Australian cricketer. He played five first-class matches for New South Wales between 1926/27 and 1927/28. 

He was a left handed batter, had a leg-break bowling style and was not a wicket keeper.

See also
 List of New South Wales representative cricketers

References

External links
 

1901 births
1985 deaths
Australian cricketers
New South Wales cricketers
Cricketers from Sydney